Matthew William Brann (born July 25, 1965) is the Chief United States district judge of the United States District Court for the Middle District of Pennsylvania.

Early life and education
Brann was born in Elmira, New York, on July 25, 1965. He received his Bachelor of Arts degree in 1987 from the University of Notre Dame. He received his Juris Doctor in 1990 from the Dickinson School of Law of the Pennsylvania State University.

Career 
From 1990 to 1991, he served as a law clerk with the Court of Common Pleas in Bradford County, Pennsylvania. He became an associate at Brann, Williams, Caldwell & Sheetz in 1991, becoming a partner at that firm in 1995. He also spent years as a Republican Party official in Pennsylvania and was active in the Federalist Society and National Rifle Association. In private practice, he focused on tort, contract, commercial, and real estate litigation.

Federal judicial service

On May 17, 2012, President Barack Obama nominated Brann to be a United States District Judge for the United States District Court for the Middle District of Pennsylvania, to the seat vacated by Judge Thomas I. Vanaskie, who was elevated to the United States Court of Appeals for the Third Circuit in 2010. Brann was recommended by Republican Senator Pat Toomey as part of a paired nomination with a recommendation by Democratic Senator Bob Casey Jr. The Senate Judiciary Committee held a hearing on his nomination on June 27, 2012, and reported it to the floor on July 19, 2012. The Senate confirmed his nomination by unanimous consent on December 21, 2012. He received his commission on December 27, 2012. Brann entered on duty as a United States District Judge on January 17, 2013. He sits at the United States Courthouse and Federal Building in Williamsport, Pennsylvania.

In September 2019, Brann was admonished by a three-judge panel of the U.S. 3rd Circuit Court of Appeals for making conclusions a jury should address and for glossing over serious disputes regarding the facts of a case.

Notable rulings

Brann presided over the case Donald J. Trump for President v. Boockvar in which the Donald Trump 2020 presidential campaign sought to block the certification of the nearly seven million presidential election votes cast in Pennsylvania. This case is one of the lawsuits challenging results from states won by president-elect Joe Biden. During an appearance before the court, Trump's lead attorney Rudy Giuliani asserted there was “widespread, nationwide voter fraud,” but under questioning by Brann, Giuliani stated, "This is not a fraud case."

Brann dismissed the case with prejudice on November 21, 2020, citing "strained legal arguments without merit and speculative accusations" which were "unsupported by evidence". Judge Brann also ruled an evidentiary hearing was not needed.
He stated that the Trump team's argument "like Frankenstein's Monster, has been haphazardly stitched together from two distinct theories in an attempt to avoid controlling precedent" and characterized the requested remedy to disqualify the votes as "unhinged from the underlying right being asserted."

The Trump campaign appealed to the United States Court of Appeals for the Third Circuit, where a three-judge panel ruled on November 27 that the District Court under Brann had been correct in preventing the Trump campaign from amending its complaint a second time. The panel also praised the District Court under Brann, stating that it had demonstrated "fast, fair, patient handling of this demanding litigation".

References

External links

1965 births
Living people
20th-century American lawyers
21st-century American judges
21st-century American lawyers
Dickinson School of Law alumni
Federalist Society members
Judges of the United States District Court for the Middle District of Pennsylvania
Pennsylvania lawyers
Pennsylvania Republicans
People from Elmira, New York
University of Notre Dame alumni
United States district court judges appointed by Barack Obama